Lucy Pearl is the only studio album by supergroup Lucy Pearl released on May 23, 2000 by EMI Records.

Track listing

Samples
"Lucy Pearl's Way" contains an interpolation of "Ask of You" by Raphael Saadiq and a sample from "Electric Relaxation" by A Tribe Called Quest.
"Hollywood" contains an interpolation of "Cry For The Bad Man" by Lynyrd Skynyrd.
"They Can't" contains a sample from "Long Kiss Goodnight" by The Notorious B.I.G.

Charts

Weekly charts

Year-end charts

Certifications

References

External links
 Lucy Pearl at Discogs

2000 debut albums
Albums produced by Battlecat (producer)
Albums produced by Raphael Saadiq